Finchley Road is a London Underground station at the corner of Finchley Road and Canfield Gardens in the London Borough of Camden, north London. It is on the Jubilee line, between West Hampstead and Swiss Cottage stations and on the Metropolitan line between Wembley Park and Baker Street stations. It is in Travelcard Zone 2.

The station is 100 yards south of the O2 Centre. It serves the Frognal and South Hampstead areas. It is also a five-minute walk from the Finchley Road & Frognal station on the London Overground's North London line, and this is marked as an official out-of-system interchange. The station is in a cutting covered by a single glass and metal canopy and is the northernmost station below street level on the line.

History 

The station was opened on 30 June 1879 by the Metropolitan Railway (MR, now the Metropolitan line) on its extension from its now closed station at Swiss Cottage (a different station from the current Swiss Cottage Jubilee line station). The station was rebuilt in 1914 with entrances incorporated into a new parade of shops.

By the mid-1930s the Metropolitan line was suffering from congestion on its main routes from north-west London, caused by the limited capacity of its tracks between Finchley Road and Baker Street stations. To alleviate this congestion new sections of deep tube tunnels were bored between Finchley Road and Baker Street to carry some of the traffic from the Stanmore branch and stations south of Wembley Park. These new tunnels opened on 20 November 1939 and from that date Finchley Road station was also served by Bakerloo line trains running from Baker Street using the new tunnels. The Bakerloo line services were subsequently transferred to the Jubilee line when that line commenced operation on 1 May 1979.

There is a proposal to add a new entrance to the station from the site of the O2 Centre, as a part of the proposal to redevelop the site for housing.

Services 

Finchley Road is served by London Underground Jubilee and Metropolitan line services. The Jubilee line, which is a stopping (or local) service, operates a service frequency of 16 tph (trains per hour) between Stanmore and Stratford. The Metropolitan line offers "stopping services" (with some peak hour "fast" and "semi-fast" services) (no Metropolitan line services stop at stations between Finchley Road and Wembley Park) from Aldgate and Baker Street to the north-west of London and certain stations in the home counties.

Connections
London Buses routes 13, 113, 187, 268, C11 and night route N113 serve the station.

References

External links 

London Transport Museum Photographic Archive

 

Jubilee line stations
London Underground Night Tube stations
Metropolitan line stations
Tube stations in the London Borough of Camden
Former Metropolitan Railway stations
Railway stations in Great Britain opened in 1879
1879 establishments in England